Studio Lambert is an independent British television production company based in London, Manchester and Los Angeles. It creates and produces scripted and unscripted programs for British and American broadcasters, cable networks and streaming platforms. It is part of All3Media, the global production group.

In the 2021 Broadcast survey of independent UK production companies, Studio Lambert ranked #5 by size of turnover. In 2019’s survey, a peer poll ranked the company #1. At the 2020 Broadcast Awards, Studio Lambert won Best Independent Production Company.

Stephen Lambert, creator of many well-known global formats, launched the company in 2008. Tim Harcourt joined in 2012, first as head of development then later he became creative director.  The company quickly grew a reputation on both sides of the Atlantic for making "innovative" and popular unscripted shows, including award-winning global hits Undercover Boss and Gogglebox, as well as The Circle, Race Across the World, Tattoo Fixers and Four in a Bed.

A scripted division headed by Susan Hogg was established in 2015 to produce high quality drama series with British and American writers, directors and on-screen talent. The company’s first scripted show, Three Girls, won five BAFTA awards in 2018. The Feed launched on Amazon Prime in 2019, The Nest premiered on BBC One to high ratings and acclaim in 2020, and Three Families launched in 2021.

The original 'Studio Lambert' was a very successful television adverts production company in the 1960s, 70s and 80s run by Stephen Lambert's father, Roger Lambert, a director of many well-known television adverts.

References

External links
 

2008 establishments in England
British companies established in 2008
Mass media companies established in 2008
Television production companies of the United States
Television production companies of the United Kingdom
Mass media companies based in London
All3Media